Chawkbazar Shahi Mosque also known as Chawk Mosque is a mosque located in the Chowk Bazaar area in the old city of Dhaka, Bangladesh. The mosque was constructed in 1664 by Subahdar Shaista Khan. The mosque is known as the Shahi Mosque because it was founded by Subahdar Shaista Khan. The mosque is built above a raised platform. The three domed mosque above the platform, now transformed into a multi-storied structure was originally a copy of Shaista Khan's another three domed mosque at the Mitford Hospital compound near the Buriganga River. There are some square-shaped rooms built for the Imam and for students of the madrasa. Today the original building design has lost much of its original form through multiple renovations and extensions. The mosque is noted for having a rainbow minaret.

Interior & exterior design

The promenade around the three domed prayer chamber, since there was no separate structure for study purpose, might have been used for open-air classes and the vaulted room with book-shelves on their walls underneath the platform may have been designed to provide residential accommodation for those who used to teach and study here. In that context Chawk Mosque may be regarded as the first known example of Residential Madrasa Mosque.

It is an ingenious way of accommodating two structures-a madrasa and a mosque in a single building which not only saved space but also a considerable amount of money.

History

The construction has been dated to 1664, as noted by an inscription in the Persian language over a doorway. The inscription attributes the project to Subahdar Shaista Khan. So far known this is the earliest dated mosque in the History of Muslim Architecture in Bengal built on a high vaulted platform. Its architectural design was perhaps influenced by Tughlaq Architectures; such as Khirki Masjid or Kalan Mosque of Delhi. Influenced by this structure some other mosques were built in Dhaka and Murshidabad.

References

Further reading
 Mamoon, M. (1993). Dhaka-Smriti Bismritir Nogori. Dhaka: Anannya (page 78)
 Husain, A. B. (2007). Architecture – A History Through Ages. Dhaka: Asiatic Society of Bangladesh (page 287)
 Karim, Abdul. (1992) Corpus of the Arabic and Persian Inscriptions of Bengal. Dhaka: Asiatic Society of Bangladesh (page 469)

External links

 https://web.archive.org/web/20131121010239/http://www.dhakacalling.com/archive/2009/oct/cover_story.php
 https://web.archive.org/web/20161220174321/http://www.kaladarshana.com/essays/essay-tughlak.html

Old Dhaka
Mosques in Dhaka
Religious buildings and structures completed in 1676